Gerard Garrison Hearst (born January 4, 1971) is an American former  professional football player who was a running back in the National Football League (NFL) for ten seasons.  He played college football for the University of Georgia, and was recognized as an All-American.  A first-round pick by the Arizona Cardinals, he also played professionally for the Cincinnati Bengals, San Francisco 49ers and Denver Broncos of the NFL.  He ran for 1,000 yards or more in four different seasons. He was named the NFL Comeback Player of the Year in 1995 and 2001.

In 1992, Hearst got third place for Heisman Trophy after rushing for 1,547 yards and 19 touchdowns. When he left Georgia, he was the second-leading career rusher. Hearst was the number 3 overall pick in the 1993 NFL Draft. He played 12 years for the NFL.

Early years
Garrison Hearst was born in Lincolnton, Georgia.  He attended Lincoln County High School in Lincolnton, where he was an all-state running back and broke several records.

College career 
Hearst attended the University of Georgia, and played for the Georgia Bulldogs football team from 1990 to 1992, leading the nation in touchdowns (21) and in scoring (11.5 points per game) in his junior year.  During his career, he established new school and Southeastern Conference (SEC) records for points scored in a season (126), total touchdowns (21), rushing touchdowns (19), and average yards per carry (6.8)*. Hearst was a Consensus All-America selection, the Doak Walker Award recipient, ESPN's ESPY Winner for Outstanding Collegiate Athlete and SEC Player of the year in 1992. He finished third in the Heisman Trophy voting.

Hearst finished his college career second on the Georgia records list in rushing yardage (3,232), all-purpose yardage (3,934), and 100-yard rushing games (16); trailing only Herschel Walker. He also finished third in career rushing touchdowns (33).

Regarded as an excellent prospect, he was taken in the 1993 NFL Draft third overall by the Arizona Cardinals.

Statistics

Professional career

Arizona Cardinals 
Hearst was drafted by the Phoenix Cardinals in the 1993 NFL Draft. In Hearst's first two seasons with the Cardinals, he was used sparingly.  In 1995, however, he broke out as a pro player, rushing for 1,070 yards. He was cut by the Cardinals in the 1996 training camp.

Cincinnati Bengals 
Hearst was then claimed off waivers by the Cincinnati Bengals.  He played there one season, gaining 847 yards, but was then picked up by the San Francisco 49ers.

San Francisco 49ers
Hearst's best years came with the San Francisco 49ers. In his first year, 1997, he ran for 1,019 yards and four touchdowns, becoming the 49ers' first 1000-yard rusher since 1992 (Ricky Watters).  The four touchdowns were more than he had scored in his entire pro career before 1997.

Hearst's true coming out, however, occurred in 1998. He ran for 1,570 yards and 7 touchdowns while averaging 5.1 yards per carry. His total rushing yards placed him third in the NFL, behind only Terrell Davis and Jamal Anderson. Hearst set a then franchise record for rushing yards in a season, breaking the former record held by Roger Craig (1,502 yards in 1988). The record held until 2006 (Frank Gore).  His 535 receiving yards gave him a combined 2,105 yards on the season, another franchise record previously held by Craig (2,066 yards in 1985), also now held by Frank Gore (2,180 yards in 2006).  Against the Detroit Lions late in the season, he set a then single-game franchise record of 198 rushing yards, which was later broken in 2000 by Charlie Garner.  He also had the longest running play in the NFL earlier in the season, when he ran 96 yards for a game-winning touchdown in overtime on opening day versus the New York Jets.  The play was later featured on NFL Films as one of the best two running plays in NFL history.

Following the great season by Hearst, he rushed for 128 yards and caught 3 passes for 15 in their wildcard win over the Green Bay Packers.  The 49ers next faced the Atlanta Falcons in the Divisional Playoffs. On the first play from scrimmage, Hearst suffered a gruesome ankle break when his foot was caught in the Georgia Dome turf and twisted severely as he tried to spin away from Falcons' defensive end Chuck Smith. Doctors said he might not play again, even though the 49ers kept him on their roster as an inactive player.

Hearst ran into complications following surgery as circulatory problems choked off the blood supply in the area, leading to Avascular Necrosis, causing the talus bone in his foot to die. Bo Jackson suffered this same condition in his hip and was forced to retire from football.

After over two years of rehabilitation, Hearst played football in 2001 and became the first player in NFL history to come back to football after suffering avascular necrosis. He had an excellent season as well, rushing for 1,206 yards on a 4.8 average. The 49ers, who were 10-22 in 2 seasons without Hearst, went 12-4 that year. He won the NFL Comeback Player of the Year award.

Hearst remained with the 49ers for two more seasons, but was used less often, the focus of the 49ers' running game shifting to Kevan Barlow. Hearst still ran for 972 yards and 768 yards in 2002 and 2003, respectively.

Hearst was released during the 49ers' offseason after the 2003 season.

Denver Broncos 
In March 2004, Hearst signed with the Denver Broncos. He was considered a "third down specialist" who had eight first downs, and 81 yards on 20 attempts with one touchdown (4.1 yards/carry) before being placed on IR with a broken hand, which was the end of his football career.

NFL career statistics

San Francisco 49ers Franchise Records 

 Most Rushing Yards (4th), Game - 198 Vs Detroit Lions (12/14/98)
 Most Rushing Attempts (Tied 4th), Game - 31 vs Seahawks (12/1/02)
 Most Consecutive 100-Yard Rushing Games (2nd), Season - 4 (1998)
 Most 100-Yard Rushing Games (2nd), Season - 6 (1998)
 Most Rushing Attempts (Tied 2nd), Season - 310 (1998)
 Most Rushing Yards In a Season (2nd) - 1,570 (1998) 
 5th All-Time in Rushing Yards (5,535)
 Led NFC in Rushing Average (1998)
 Led NFL in Longest Run (1998)

Life post NFL 
In 2022, it was announced that he was nominated for the 2023 College Hall of Fame Awards.

Personal life
Hearst is married and has four children. He resides in Georgia.

Gay slur controversy

In 2002, Hearst made inflammatory anti-gay comments to the Fresno Bee after Esera Tuaolo admitted he was gay. "Aww, hell no! I don't want any faggots on my team. I know this might not be what people want to hear, but that's a punk. I don't want any faggots in this locker room." Three weeks later, Hearst apologized for his comments.

See also
 List of NCAA major college football yearly scoring leaders

References

External links
A video of Hearst's 96 yard touchdown run from NFL.com

1971 births
Living people
All-American college football players
American football running backs
Arizona Cardinals players
Cincinnati Bengals players
Denver Broncos players
Georgia Bulldogs football players
National Conference Pro Bowl players
People from Lincolnton, Georgia
Phoenix Cardinals players
Players of American football from Georgia (U.S. state)
San Francisco 49ers players
Ed Block Courage Award recipients